Wadena County is a county in the U.S. state of Minnesota. As of the 2020 census, the population was 14,065. Its county seat is Wadena.

History
The newly organized Minnesota Legislature created the county on June 11, 1858. A settlement began at the future city of Wadena in 1871, and by 1873 a post office was in operation there. The settlement was designated the county seat when the state legislature organized the county on February 21, 1873. The town took the name of a trading post 15 miles (24 km) to the east, which had flourished for several years but was largely abandoned by that time. The trading post was named for Chief Wadena, an Ojibwe Indian chief of the late 19th century in northwestern Minnesota.

Wadena County comprises 15 townships, first surveyed in 1863. Each township is six miles square and contains 36 sections of land (with the exception of Bullard and Thomastown, which have a slightly different configuration because their boundaries are aligned with the Leaf and Crow Wing Rivers, respectively). In 1857 Augustus Aspinwall laid out a town site in what is now Section 15, Thomastown township, at the junction of the Crow Wing and Partridge rivers, and named it Wadena. When the railroad went through the area in 1872 it ran about three miles south of this site and the town quickly withered away.

During the last part of the 19th century and the first half of the 20th, there were two railroads in the county. The Northern Pacific main line running east to west through Wadena was built in 1872, while the Great Northern branch or "K" line which ran from Sauk Centre to Bemidji, via Sebeka and Menahga, was completed in 1891. The line from Park Rapids to Long Prairie was abandoned in 1984 while the rest was abandoned in the early 1970s with the northern section from Park Rapids to Cass Lake since converted to the Heartland Trail.

Wadena used to be served by the Greyhound Bus Line, Elliott Bros. Transportation Co., Northwest Transportation Co., Red Bus Line, Gray Bus Line, Liederbach Bus Co. and Mercury Bus line.

There are four historical societies in the county, including the Wadena County Historical Society, the Verndale Historical Society, the Sebeka Finnish American Historical Society and the Menahga Historical Society.

In 2010 there were four organized school districts in the county: Wadena, Verndale, Sebeka and Menahga. In 1906 there were 52 school districts in the county, most of which were rural schools.

Sebeka once had Minnesota's second-largest creamery. Over the years there have been approximately ten creameries in the county and ten cheese factories.

Geography
The Crow Wing River flows south through the east-central part of the county and forms the lower part of the county's eastern border as it turns to flow southeast. The Partridge River flows east through the southern part of the county, discharging into the Crow Wing in the county's southeast corner. The Leaf River flows east through the central part of the county, discharging into the Crow Wing in the county's eastern portion. The county terrain consists of low rolling hills, carved by drainages, devoted to agriculture wherever possible. The terrain slopes to the east and south, with its highest point near its northwest corner, at 1,460' (445m) ASL. Wadena is one of 17 Minnesota counties with more savanna soils than prairie or forest soils.

Major highways

  U.S. Route 10
  U.S. Route 71
  Minnesota State Highway 29
  Minnesota State Highway 87

Airports
 Staples Municipal Airport (SAZ) - north of Staples

Adjacent counties

 Hubbard County - north
 Cass County - east
 Todd County - south
 Otter Tail County - southwest
 Becker County - northwest

Protected areas

 Burgen Lake Prairie Wildlife Management Area
 Dry Sand State Wildlife Management Area
 Huntersville State Forest
 Lyons State Forest
 Old Wadena County Park
 Old Wadena Historic District

Lakes

 Bill Lake
 Blueberry Lake
 Burgen Lake
 Duck Lake (part)
 Finn Lake
 Granning Lake
 Jim Cook Lake
 Lily Lake
 Lovejoy Lake
 Lower Twin Lake
 Mud Lake
 Radabaugh Lake
 Rice Lake
 Round Lake
 Simon Lake
 Spirit Lake
 Stocking Lake
 Strike Lake]
 Thomas Lake
 Upper Twin Lake (part)
 Yaeger Lake

Demographics

2000 census
As of the 2020 census, there were 13,713 people, 5,426 households, and 3,608 families in the county. The population density was 25.6/sqmi (9.88/km2). There were 6,334 housing units at an average density of 11.8/sqmi (4.56/km2). The racial makeup of the county was 97.89% White, 0.48% Black or African American, 0.55% Native American, 0.18% Asian, 0.03% Pacific Islander, 0.27% from other races, and 0.59% from two or more races. 0.93% of the population were Hispanic or Latino of any race. 37.5% were of German, 14.0% Norwegian, 12.5% Finnish, 9.0% United States or American and 5.3% Swedish ancestry.

There were 5,426 households, out of which 30.00% had children under the age of 18 living with them, 55.30% were married couples living together, 7.60% had a female householder with no husband present, and 33.50% were non-families. 29.20% of all households were made up of individuals, and 15.10% had someone living alone who was 65 years of age or older. The average household size was 2.45 and the average family size was 3.02.

The county population contained 25.80% under the age of 18, 8.10% from 18 to 24, 23.60% from 25 to 44, 22.60% from 45 to 64, and 19.90% who were 65 years of age or older. The median age was 40 years. For every 100 females there were 97.90 males. For every 100 females age 18 and over, there were 94.90 males.

The median income for a household in the county was $30,651, and the median income for a family was $38,618. Males had a median income of $28,424 versus $21,027 for females. The per capita income for the county was $15,146. About 9.70% of families and 14.10% of the population were below the poverty line, including 15.40% of those under age 18 and 12.60% of those age 65 or over.

2020 Census

Communities

Cities

 Aldrich
 Menahga
 Nimrod
 Sebeka
 Staples (part)
 Verndale
 Wadena (county seat; partly in Otter Tail County)

Unincorporated communities
 Bluegrass
 Huntersville
 Oylen

Ghost towns
 Leaf River
 Shell City

Townships

 Aldrich Township
 Blueberry Township
 Bullard Township
 Huntersville Township
 Leaf River Township
 Lyons Township
 Meadow Township
 North Germany Township
 Orton Township
 Red Eye Township
 Rockwood Township
 Shell River Township
 Thomastown Township
 Wadena Township
 Wing River Township

Government and politics
Wadena County voters have traditionally voted Republican. In only one national election since 1964 has the county selected the Democratic Party candidate (as of 2020).

See also
 National Register of Historic Places listings in Wadena County, Minnesota

References

External links
 Wadena County government’s website
 Wadena County Historical Society

 
Minnesota counties
Minnesota placenames of Native American origin
1873 establishments in Minnesota
Populated places established in 1873